Puerto Rico competed at the 1998 Winter Olympics in Nagano, Japan.

Alpine skiing

Men

Bobsleigh

References
Official Olympic Reports
 Olympic Winter Games 1998, full results by sports-reference.com

Nations at the 1998 Winter Olympics
1998 Winter Olympics
Winter Olympics